Konzelmann, Konzelman, Conzelmann may refer to:

 Dustin-Leigh Seltzer, née Konzelman (born 1982), a beauty queen and reality television contestant
 Gerhard Konzelmann (1932, Stuttgart – 2008, Stuttgart), a German journalist
 Hans Conzelmann, was a Protestant, German theologian and New Testament scholar.

References 

German-language surnames